Kenneth Kadji (born May 19, 1988) is a Cameroonian professional basketball player for Limoges CSP of the LNB Pro A. He played college basketball for the University of Florida and University of Miami.

High school career
Kadji attended IMG Academy in Bradenton, Florida, where in 2008, he was ranked fifth among centers by Rivals.com and sixth by Scout.com.

College career
Kadji initially chose to play at Florida under coach Billy Donovan. He regularly came off the bench in his freshman year of 2008–09, averaging 4.4 points and 2.7 rebounds per game, but his sophomore season was cut short by a back injury that required surgery. After that season, Kadji transferred to Miami, where one of his brothers was attending; he later said that he left Florida "for a fresh start", indicating that he had no problems with Florida's coaches.

After sitting out the 2010–11 season due to NCAA transfer rules, Kadji became a starter at Miami in 2011–12, averaging 11.7 points, 5.3 rebounds, and 1.6 blocks while being named third-team All-ACC. The following season, Kadji averaged 12.9 points and 6.8 rebounds for a Hurricanes team that won the ACC regular-season and tournament titles, and was named second-team All-ACC.

Professional career

2013–14 season
After going undrafted in the 2013 NBA draft, Kadji joined the Cleveland Cavaliers for the 2013 NBA Summer League. On September 30, 2013, he signed with the Cavaliers, but was later waived by the team on October 25.

On December 6, 2013, Kadji signed a three-month contract with New Yorker Phantoms Braunschweig of the Basketball Bundesliga. On January 7, 2014, he parted ways with Phantoms after appearing in just five games. On January 25, he was acquired by the Rio Grande Valley Vipers of the NBA Development League. He spent the rest of the 2013–14 season with the Vipers, averaging 6.2 points and 3.5 rebounds in 20 games.

2014–15 season
In July 2014, Kadji joined the Milwaukee Bucks for the 2014 NBA Summer League. On August 19, 2014, he signed a one-year deal with Aries Trikala of the Greek Basket League. On February 14, 2015, he left Trikala and signed with Dinamo Sassari of the Italian Serie A for the rest of the season.

2015–16 season
On July 11, 2015, Kadji signed with Enel Brindisi, also of the Serie A, for the 2015–16 season. On February 1, 2016, he left Brindisi and returned to his former team Dinamo Sassari for the rest of the season.

2016–17 season
On July 23, 2016, Kadji signed with Lithuanian club Lietuvos rytas Vilnius. On October 2, 2016, he parted ways with Lietuvos rytas after three games and signed with Turkish club Trabzonspor for the rest of the season.

2017–18 & 2018–19 season
On June 9, 2017, Kadji signed with Turkish club Tofaş for the 2017–18 season.

2019–20 season
On September 14, 2019, he has signed with Estudiantes of the Spanish Liga ACB.

On February 29, 2020, he has signed with Türk Telekom of the Turkish Super League.

2020–21 season
On August 17, 2020, Kadji signed with Frutti Extra Bursaspor of the Turkish league.

2021–22 season
On July 21, 2021, he has signed with BCM Gravelines-Dunkerque of the LNB Pro A.

2022–23 season
On July 23, 2022, he has signed with Hapoel Holon of the Israeli Basketball Premier League. On January 30, 2023, he signed with Limoges CSP of the LNB Pro A.

References

External links
 Lega Basket profile
 FIBA profile
 Miami Hurricanes bio
 TBLStat.net profile

1988 births
Living people
Aries Trikala B.C. players
Basketball Löwen Braunschweig players
BC Rytas players
BCM Gravelines players
Bursaspor Basketbol players
Cameroonian expatriate basketball people in Germany
Cameroonian expatriate basketball people in Greece
Cameroonian expatriate basketball people in Israel
Cameroonian expatriate basketball people in Italy
Cameroonian expatriate basketball people in Lithuania
Cameroonian expatriate basketball people in Spain
Cameroonian expatriate basketball people in the United States
Cameroonian men's basketball players
CB Estudiantes players
Dinamo Sassari players
Florida Gators men's basketball players
French men's basketball players
French sportspeople of Cameroonian descent
Hapoel Holon players
IMG Academy alumni
Lega Basket Serie A players
Liga ACB players
Limoges CSP players
Miami Hurricanes men's basketball players
New Basket Brindisi players
Power forwards (basketball)
Rio Grande Valley Vipers players
Sportspeople from Douala
Tofaş S.K. players
Trabzonspor B.K. players